Christopher Bonnewell Burton Norwood (17 December 1932 – 14 November 1972) was a Labour Party politician in the United Kingdom. 

Norwood was educated at Whitgift School, Croydon and Gonville and Caius College, Cambridge, whence he graduated with a BA in 1953. Following university Norwood worked firstly as a management trainee, then assumed various positions at the National Coal Board (NCB) before finding employment in the economic projection section of the Central Electricity Generating Board (CEGB). Having previously contested Sutton Coldfield in 1955 and Bromsgrove in 1959, at the 1964 general election he was elected as the Member of Parliament (MP) for Norwich South, serving until he stood down in 1970. Norwood died suddenly two years later aged 39, leaving behind one son by his ex-wife Beryl.

Footnotes

References

External links 
 

1932 births
1972 deaths
Labour Party (UK) MPs for English constituencies
UK MPs 1964–1966
UK MPs 1966–1970